Kevin Yonas Argadiba Sitorus (born 17 July 1994) is an Indonesian professional basketball player for the Satria Muda Pertamina Jakarta club of the Indonesian Basketball League. He represented Indonesia's national basketball team at the 2017 SEABA Championship in Quezon City, Philippines.

Career Statistics

NBL/IBL

Regular season

Playoffs

International

References

External links
 Indonesian Basketball League profile
 Asia-basket.com profile
 NBL Indonesia profile

1994 births
Living people
Indonesian men's basketball players
People of Batak descent
Power forwards (basketball)
Sportspeople from Jakarta
Southeast Asian Games silver medalists for Indonesia
Southeast Asian Games medalists in basketball
Basketball players at the 2018 Asian Games
Competitors at the 2017 Southeast Asian Games
Asian Games competitors for Indonesia
Competitors at the 2019 Southeast Asian Games